is a train station on the Hankyu Railway Kyoto Line located in Ōyamazaki, Otokuni District, Kyoto Prefecture, Japan.

Lines
Hankyu Railway Kyoto Line

Layout
The station has two side platforms serving two tracks.

Usage
In fiscal 2007, about 1,333,000 passengers started travel from this station annually.

Surrounding
Yamazaki Station (JR West)

History 
Oyamazaki Station opened on 1 November 1928.

Station numbering was introduced to all Hankyu stations on 21 December 2013 with this station being designated as station number HK-75.

References

External links
Station website 

Hankyu Kyoto Main Line
Railway stations in Kyoto Prefecture
Railway stations in Japan opened in 1928